Johannes Drost (22 June 1880 – 18 September 1954) was a Dutch backstroke swimmer and diver who competed in the 1900 Summer Olympics.

He won the bronze medal in the 200 m backstroke event in a time of 3:01.0, narrowly beating compatriot Johannes Bloemen. This was the first swimming medal and the first individual Olympic medal ever for the Netherlands.

Drost also competed at other international competitions. Among others in Antwerp, Belgium, in the week after he competed at the 1900 Summer Olympics, finishing second in te 100 metres backstroke, and won the diving competition.

Drost won in diving and swimming several medals at national championships.

References

External links
 

1880 births
1954 deaths
Dutch male backstroke swimmers
Dutch male divers
Olympic swimmers of the Netherlands
Swimmers at the 1900 Summer Olympics
Olympic bronze medalists for the Netherlands
Swimmers from Rotterdam
Olympic bronze medalists in swimming
Medalists at the 1900 Summer Olympics